Border Five (Border 5; B5) is an informal forum on customs and border management policy issues with participation from Australia, Canada, New Zealand, the United Kingdom and the United States. The participating authorities are:
 Department of Home Affairs (Australia)
 Canada Border Services Agency
 The New Zealand Customs Service
 The United Kingdom UK Border Force
 US Department of Homeland Security

See also
 Anglosphere
 CANZUK
 Five Country Conference
 Five Eyes
 Five Nations Passport Group

References

Border guards
Customs services
Anglosphere

External links
 About 5CCW - Five Country Conference Watch
 From Insularity to Exteriority: How the Anglosphere is Shaping Global Governance – Centre for International Policy Studies